Henry Moyo (21 December 1946 – 12 October 2012) was a Malawian footballer, coach, and manager.

Moyo played for Bata Bullets and the Malawi national football team from 1967 to 1975, after quitting club and national duty, he was appointed assist national coach to Brazilian Wonder Moreira in 1975. In 1975, Malawi took part in their maiden Confederation of East and Central Senior Challenge cup hosted by Zambia.  The Flames of Malawi lost to Kenya in the finals. In 1981, he was appointed deputy National coach to Ted Powell. In 1983, he was acting coach and under Moyo Malawi qualified for their ever appearance at the Nations Cup hosted by Ivory Coast, Danny McLennan was appointed as the head coach and took charge of the team in Ivory Coast. In 1984 Moyo was appointed caretaker coach for a second time, after McLennan was fired for poor performance at the nations cup. The team reached the finals of CECAFA hosted by Uganda and lost to Zambia on post match penalties. In 1987 under Moyo the Flames qualified for the All-Africa Games after beating Zambia on the away goal rule, Malawi lost 3-1 away in Zambia and beat Chipolopolo 2-0 in Blantyre in the return leg through Frank Sinalo and Holman Malunga.

He quit the national team through an interview with popular sports journalist Steve Liwewe and joined Super League of Malawi outfit MDC United as manager. In 1988 MDC United won the Super League championship without defeat and it was the first time in the history of Malawi for a team to win the league without losing game. In 1990, he retired from his post as manager of MDC United and joined Portland Cement as Sales Manager.

From 1990 to 2003 he was a Confederation of Africa Football CAF match commissioner. 
From 1996-2004 he was appointed as sports adviser by former president of Malawi Bakili Muluzi.

References 

1946 births
2012 deaths
Malawian footballers
Malawi international footballers
Nyasa Big Bullets FC players
Malawi national football team managers
People from Ndola

Association footballers not categorized by position
Malawian football managers